The following highways are numbered 26B:

India
 National Highway 26B

United States
 Nebraska Spur 26B
 New York State Route 26B (former)